Ulick Burke (born 19 November 1943) is a former Irish Fine Gael politician. He served as a Teachta Dála (TD) for the Galway East constituency from 1997 to 2002 and 2007 to 2011, and was also a Senator for three terms.

After unsuccessfully contesting the 1981 general election in Galway East, Burke was nominated by the Taoiseach, Garret FitzGerald to the 15th Seanad. He was unsuccessful again at the February 1982 general election, and was defeated in the subsequent election to the 16th Seanad.  After further Dáil defeats at a by-election in July 1982 and at the November 1982 general election, he was returned at the 1983 elections to the 17th Seanad, on the Agricultural Panel. He failed again at the 1987 general election, and lost his Seanad seat at the 1987 Seanad election.

Burke did not contest the 1992 general election, and was finally elected as a TD at the 1997 general election when the Galway East constituency was increased to 4 seats. He failed to be re-elected to Dáil Éireann at the 2002 general election, but was subsequently elected to the 22nd Seanad Éireann on the Agricultural Panel. He re-gained his Dáil seat at the 2007 general election.

He was the Fine Gael Deputy spokesperson on Education with special responsibility for Lifelong Learning and School Transport from 2007 to 2011.

He retired from politics at the 2011 general election.

References

 

1943 births
Living people
Alumni of the University of Galway
Fine Gael senators
Fine Gael TDs
Local councillors in County Galway
Members of the 15th Seanad
Members of the 17th Seanad
Members of the 28th Dáil
Members of the 22nd Seanad
Members of the 30th Dáil
Nominated members of Seanad Éireann
Politicians from County Galway